is a Japanese former professional footballer who played as a defender.

Club career
Tsuboi was educated at and played for Yokkaichi Chuo Technical High School and Fukuoka University.

After graduating from the university in 2002, he joined Urawa Red Diamonds and immediately broke into the first team. His first appearance came on 3 March 2002 against Yokohama F. Marinos in opening game in 2002 season. He scored his first league goal on 17 May 2003 against Gamba Osaka. He won the Rookie of the Year award in 2002 and was selected as one of the J.League Best Eleven in 2003. In 2006, Reds won the champions in J1 League which is first J1 champions in the club history. In 2007, Reds won first Asian title AFC Champions League. Although he played many matches as regular center back until 2010, he could not play many matches from 2011.

In 2015, Tsuboi moved to Shonan Bellmare. However he could not play many matches and Bellmare was relegated to J2 League end of 2016 season. In 2018, he moved to J2 club Renofa Yamaguchi FC.

International career
Tsuboi represented Japan for the 2001 Summer Universiade held in Beijing where the team won the title beating Ukraine in the final.

Japan's national coach Zico gave him the first cap in 2003 when he played Tsuboi on 11 June 2003 in a friendly against Paraguay at Saitama Stadium. He was a member of the Japan team for 2006 FIFA World Cup where he played 2 games against Australia and Brazil. In Japan's first match against Australia, he suffered from cramps in his both thighs and had to be replaced by Teruyuki Moniwa in the 56th minute.

He was also in the squad for 2007 Asian Cup but did not play any game in the tournament as Yuki Abe and Yuji Nakazawa were the first-choice centre backs.

On 8 February 2008, he announced retirement from international football. He played 40 games for Japan until 2007.

Career statistics

Club

International

Honours
Urawa Reds
 J1 League: 2006
 Emperor's Cup: 2005, 2006
 J.League Cup: 2003
 AFC Champions League: 2007
 Japanese Super Cup: 2006

Shonan Bellmare
 J2 League: 2017

Individual
 J.League Best Eleven: 2003
 J.League Rookie of the Year: 2002
 J. League Cup New Hero Award: 2002

References

External links
 
 

 
 Japan National Football Team Database
 Profile at Renofa Yamaguchi FC 
 Yahoo! Sports Profile 

1979 births
Living people
Fukuoka University alumni
People from Tama, Tokyo
Association football people from Tokyo Metropolis
Japanese footballers
Japan international footballers
J1 League players
J2 League players
Urawa Red Diamonds players
Shonan Bellmare players
Renofa Yamaguchi FC players
2003 FIFA Confederations Cup players
2005 FIFA Confederations Cup players
2006 FIFA World Cup players
2007 AFC Asian Cup players
Association football defenders